Dhillon ( pronunciation: [ʈi˨llõː]) is a tribe of Jats found in the Punjab region.   

Notable people who bear the name, who may or may not be affiliated with the tribe, include:
 Amritpal Singh Dhillon, an Indian-born Canadian singer, rapper, songwriter and record producer
 Bob Singh Dhillon, Canadian businessman and property owner
 Chhajja Singh Dhillon, 18th-century founder of the Bhangi Misl
 Gurinder Singh Dhillon, guru of Radha Soami Satsang Beas
 Gurdial Singh Dhillon (1915–1992), Speaker of Lok Sabha, the lower house of the Parliament of India
 Hari Singh Dhillon, 18th-century maharaja
 Harmeet Dhillon (born 1969), American lawyer and political official
 Janet Dhillon, American lawyer and business executive, chair of the Equal Employment Opportunity Commission 2019–2021
 Jhanda Singh Dhillon, 18th-century maharaja
 Joginder Singh Dhillon (1914–2003), officer in the British Indian Army and Indian Army
 Kanwal Jeet Singh Dhillon,  is a retired Lieutenant General Officer of the Indian Army
 Navneet Kaur Dhillon, Femina Miss India 2013 and Bollywood and television actress
 Poonam Dhillon, Bollywood and television actress
 Rukshar Dhillon, British actress
 Uttam Dhillon, American attorney and law enforcement official, husband of Janet Dhillon
 Vic Dhillon, Canadian politician
 Zulfiqar Ahmad Dhillon (born 1948), Pakistan Army brigadier

See also 
 Dillon (disambiguation)

References

Jat clans
Indian surnames
Punjabi-language surnames